Phú Vĩnh is a rural commune (xã) of Tân Châu town in An Giang Province, Vietnam.

References

Communes of An Giang province
Populated places in An Giang province